The Autovía CA-33 is an autovía in the province of Cádiz, Andalusia, Spain. It runs south-east from the city of Cádiz to the nearby city of San Fernando, and from there to the Autovía A-4 and the Autovía A-48, for a distance of 13 km (8 miles). Originally part of the N-IV road, it received the CA-33 designation in 2003.

CA-33
Transport in Andalusia